Linatella is a genus of sea snails known as predatory whelks, marine gastropod mollusks in the family Cymatiidae.

Species
The only species within the genus Linatella is:
 Linatella caudata (Gmelin, 1791)

Species brought into synonymy
 Subgenus Linatella (Gelagna) Schaufuss, 1869 : synonym of  Gelagna Schaufuss, 1869
 Linatella (Gelagna) pallida Parth, 1996 : synonym of Gelagna pallida (Parth, 1996)
 Linatella clandestina Lamarck : synonym of Gelagna succincta (Linnaeus, 1771)
 Linatella neptunia Garrard, 1963 : synonym of Linatella caudata (Gmelin, 1791)
 Linatella succincta (Linnaeus, 1771) : synonym of Gelagna succincta (Linnaeus, 1771)

References

 Gofas, S.; Le Renard, J.; Bouchet, P. (2001). Mollusca, in: Costello, M.J. et al. (Ed.) (2001). European register of marine species: a check-list of the marine species in Europe and a bibliography of guides to their identification. Collection Patrimoines Naturels, 50: pp. 180–213

Cymatiidae
Monotypic gastropod genera